The 2015 Irish budget was the Irish Government budget for the 2015 fiscal year, which was presented to Dáil Éireann on 14 October 2014.

The Minister for Finance Michael Noonan outlined the taxation measures with Brendan Howlin detailing the spending.	
The government reversed some of the austerity measures that were introduced over the past six years with extra spending and tax cuts worth just over €1bn.

Summary
Child Benefit increase to rise €5 per child
New 8% USC rate for those earning over €70,000
Entry point for USC raised to above €12,000
Water Charges Relief worth up to €100 
Income tax relief on water charges up to max of €500 
41% Income Tax rate reduced to 40%
Price of 20 cigarettes to rise by 40c from 15 October 2014
9% VAT rate to stay
'Double Irish' tax arrangement to be abolished by 2020

References

External links
Budget 2015 Document
Irish budget, 2015 at Tax Institute
Irish budget, 2015 at Irish Independent
Irish budget, 2015 at Irish Times

2014 in Irish politics
Budget
2015 government budgets
2015 in Irish politics
Budget
October 2014 events in Ireland
31st Dáil
15
Michael Noonan (Fine Gael politician)